Ian Nimmo (born 25 July 1985) is a Scottish rugby union player who plays as a lock forward. Nimmo moved to Perthshire, Scotland at the age of 14. He has been capped by Scotland at Under 19 and Under 20 levels and was included in the Scotland under 20 squad for the 2005 and 2009 Junior World Cups.

In July 2012 Nimmo joined Welsh regional team Newport Gwent Dragons. having previously played for Leicester Tigers and Cornish Pirates.

In September 2013 Nimmo joined London Irish on a short loan deal

On 7 November 2013, Ian Nimmo had signed to London Welsh in the RFU Championship.

References

External links
Newport Gwent Dragons profile

1985 births
Living people
Dragons RFC players
Heriot's RC players
Leicester Tigers players
People educated at the High School of Dundee
Rugby union players from Harlow
Scottish rugby union players
Rugby union locks